Matt Simon (born December 6, 1953) is an American football coach and former player. He is currently a Defensive and Special Teams Analyst with the University of Maryland Terrapins. Prior to arriving at UMD, Simon was the offensive coordinator for the Delaware Fightin' Blue Hens football program,from 2017 to 2019.  Simon has previously coached in the collegiate ranks,most notably as head coach at the University of North Texas from 1994 to 1997. Simon is one of only ten football coaches to win both an NCAA Division I-A/FBS national championship (with Washington in 1991) and a Super Bowl (with the Baltimore Ravens in 2000).

Born in Akron, Ohio, Simon grew up in El Paso, Texas. He attended Burges High School where he was a three-sport standout in football, track and wrestling. He earned four letters as a linebacker for the Eastern New Mexico University Greyhounds and was later inducted into the ENMU Hall of Honors. Immediately following his playing career, Simon began his coaching career as a graduate assistant at his alma mater. After one year as an assistant at Borger High School, Simon coached the tight end and linebacker positions at the University of Texas at El Paso under head coach Bill Michael.

In 1982, he became running backs and placekickers coach at the University of Washington. The Huskies went to nine bowl games over a span of ten seasons. In 1991, the Huskies tied the Miami Hurricanes for the national championship. In 1997, Simon was inducted into the University of Washington's Hall of Fame. Simon left Washington in 1992 for the offensive coordinator position at New Mexico under head coach Dennis Franchione. The Lobos averaged 413 yards and 30.5 points per game during that span. They ranked 13th in the country in 1992 and improved to 8th the following year.

Simon succeeded Dennis Parker as head coach at North Texas in 1994, becoming only the 10th African American to lead a Division I-A football squad. In his first season, Simon guided North Texas to the Southland Conference Championship. He was named Southland Conference Coach of the Year, Black Coaches Association National Football Coach of the Year and AFCA Region 4 Coach of the Year. Simon resigned in January,1998 because of scheduling differences with the athletic administration. Simon believed the proposed 1998 non conference schedule put too many North Texas football players at risk for injury.

After coaching at the Denver Broncos training camp and volunteering through the 1998–1999 season,  Simon began his pro coaching career with the Baltimore Ravens. Under his guidance, Baltimore rushed for an average of 1,985 yards per season and defeated the New York Giants in Super Bowl XXXV following the 2000 NFL season. In 2004, the Ravens’ ground attack produced 2,063 total yards and ranked 9th in the NFL. It was Jamal Lewis's fourth 1,000-yard rushing season under Simon. Baltimore rushed for at least 2,000 yards in three different seasons under Simon, including a team-record 2,674 yards in 2003 when Jamal Lewis was named NFL Offensive Player of the Year, and Associated Press All-Pro and selected to the AFC Pro Bowl. In 2006, Matt Simon resigned from the Ravens to pursue other opportunities in the NFL because of uncertainties with former Head Coach Brian Billick's tenor with the team.

Simon's success with running backs continued during his time with the San Diego Chargers in the 2007–08 season.  He helped lead LaDainian Tomlinson to his second NFL rushing title while coaching Pro Bowl Fullback, Lorenzo Neal and RB, Darren Sproles.

In 2011 Simon joined the coaching staff at the University of Buffalo. During his tenor at UB, Simon coached three All- Conference Running Backs and two All- Conference Punters and Kicker.

One of those All- Conference RBs, Branden Oliver,  broke James Starks' single season school rushing record at the University at Buffalo in 2011 with Simon as his coach.

Head coaching record

References

1953 births
Living people
American football linebackers
Baltimore Ravens coaches
Buffalo Bulls football coaches
Delaware Fightin' Blue Hens football coaches
Eastern New Mexico Greyhounds football coaches
Eastern New Mexico Greyhounds football players
New Mexico Lobos football coaches
North Texas Mean Green football coaches
San Diego Chargers coaches
UTEP Miners football coaches
Washington Huskies football coaches
High school football coaches in Ohio
High school football coaches in Texas
Players of American football from Akron, Ohio
Coaches of American football from Texas
Players of American football from El Paso, Texas
African-American coaches of American football
African-American players of American football
African-American male track and field athletes
20th-century African-American sportspeople
21st-century African-American sportspeople